Kenickie were an English four-piece pop punk band from Sunderland. The band was formed in 1994 and consisted of lead vocalist, guitarist and lyricist Lauren Laverne (b. Lauren Gofton), drummer Johnny X (real name Pete Gofton, Lauren's brother), lead guitarist and occasional lead vocalist Marie du Santiago (b. Anne Marie Nixon) and bass guitarist Emmy-Kate Montrose (b. Emma Jackson). The band's name comes from their favourite character in the film Grease.

History

By the time Catsuit City (1995) was released on Slampt, Kenickie declined an offer by Alan McGee to sign to Creation. The band opened the bill for the Ramones final UK appearance at the Brixton Academy on 3 February 1996. Following the release of Skillex (1996) on Fierce Panda, Kenickie signed to Saint Etienne's EMI subsidiary, EMIDisc. Kenickie registered in the UK Singles Chart, their highest position being No. 24 with the single "In Your Car", which opened Top of the Pops on the 10 January 1997 edition.  Their debut album At The Club, peaked at No. 9 in the UK Albums Chart in May 1997. Kenickie also contributed a song to the Gary Numan tribute album Random, released in June that year. That summer, they were scheduled to play Glastonbury; their set was postponed, due to rain, but took place later on the scheduled day.

After meeting them in New York, Courtney Love said:
They're a big bunch of sex, that band Kenickie. They're a big, raw-boned bunch of fucking sex — all three of them and the boy. I hope they get good. I hope we're a good example to them, I hope this record's huge and then the big labels will start sniffing around and then those big fucking raw-boned sexy Newcastle (sic) girls will be huge and have Number Ones and there will be an Amazon planet the way I want it.

The band's second album, Get In appeared in 1998. It was well received in the music press (NME generally praised the album while Melody Maker rated it 8/10), but sold less well. Johnny X, who now referred to himself as Pete X, moved to guitar, with the live band augmented by Graham Christie (later of Data Panik) on drums and Dot Allen on keyboards.

Kenickie disbanded on 15 October 1998 after a London Astoria gig, where Lauren closed the night by saying "We were Kenickie ... a bunch of fuckwits".

After Kenickie
Lauren Laverne released one solo EP in 2000, Take These Flowers Away, and earlier that year sang on the Mint Royale single, "Don't Falter", which reached No. 15 in the UK chart. Laverne also was an uncredited vocalist on The Divine Comedy's 2004 single "Come Home Billy Bird" which reached No. 25 in the same chart. Since then she has presented various radio shows on radio station Xfm, most notably the breakfast show, before quitting in April 2007. She moved into television, originally as a guest on early episodes of music quiz Never Mind the Buzzcocks. She earned her own weekly spot on Channel 4 music show Planet Pop and became presenter, with Myleene Klass, of ITV music programme cd:uk in 2005, and hosted Channel 4's music show Transmission with Steve Jones in 2006 and 2007. She currently presents the breakfast show on BBC 6 Music, and in 2018, she became the host of BBC Radio 4's Desert Island Discs. 

Du Santiago and Montrose started short-lived clubnight Shimmy in Gerrard Street, London before they went on to form a new band called Rosita, and released two singles before splitting up in September 2001. Du Santiago retired from music at this point before returning in 2007 - as Marie Nixon - as a member of The Cornshed Sisters.  They have released two album so far - Tell Tales (2012) and Honey and Tar (2017). Nixon's four songwriting credits on the latter were the first new songs released by any of the three female Kenickie members since Laverne's EP seventeen years earlier.  She  is also former head of communications for the Northern region of the Arts Council.  In Autumn 2012, she took up position as Chief Executive of the University of Sunderland Students' Union. 

Montrose - as Emma Jackson - formed synth trio The Pictures after Rosita split and later edited journal The High Horse during 2005-2010 while occasionally playing with jam band Snakes And Ladders. She completed a PhD in sociology in 2010 at Goldsmiths University. After some time as a research fellow in Urban Studies at the University of Glasgow, she returned to Goldsmiths in January 2015 as a lecturer in the Department of Sociology.

Johnny X went on to record under the name J Xaverre. He toured with Peter Brewis of Field Music's new project 'The Week That Was' and later played in Frankie & The Heartstrings.

The band's one-time touring keyboard player Tony O'Neill (known in the band as Elvis Wesley) is now an author, living in the United States.

Laverne is the last remaining member of the band to still use her Kenickie stagename - Nixon and Jackson last referred to themselves as Du Santiago and Montrose in early 2002 for a DJ appearance together at London clubnight Stay Beautiful.  Pete Gofton had already ceased calling himself "Johnny X" during the band's lifetime due to an American rapper at the time using the name.

Legacy
Kenickie have been credited as  having inspired a wave of mainstream female guitar bands that emerged in the wake of their split, including 21st Century Girls, Hepburn and Thunderbugs.  At around the same time they also were a cited influence on a generation of female alternative bands, such as Chicks, Angelica, Cheetara (who covered Come Out 2Nite) and Vyvyan, many of them associated with the Club Rampage/Club P*rnstar "Bratpop" scene.

Discography

Studio albums
At the Club (Emidisc 1997)
Get In (EMI 1998)

Radio sessions album 

 The John Peel Sessions (1999, Strange Fruit Records)

Singles/EPs
Catsuit City EP vinyl (Slampt Records 1995)
Skillex EP (vinyl two tracks Fierce Panda 1995, CD four tracks Fierce Panda 1996)
"Punka" (CD Emidisc 1996)
"Millionaire Sweeper" (CD Emidisc 1996)
"In Your Car" (two CDs Emidisc 1997)
"Nightlife" (two CDs Emidisc 1997)
"Punka" revised edition (two CDs Emidisc 1997)
"I Would Fix You" (two CDs EMI 1998)
"Stay in the Sun" (two CDs EMI 1998)

Compilation appearances
"Walrus" demo - Signal vs Noise CD (1994)
"Hey, Punka" demo - Laugh Hard at the Absurdly Evil (1995)
"Rebel Assault" - Electric Jet Mission LP, Slampt (1995)
"Gary 2" - The Camden Crawl CD, Love Train (1995)
"My Nites Out" - And the Rest Is History CD, Xerox (1996) 
"Come Out 2Nite" - Phoenix - The Album CD, New Millenium Communications (1997)
"I'm an Agent" - Random - Gary Numan tribute CD (1997)
"It Started with a Kiss" - Come Again CD, EMI (1997)

Videography

References

External links
 BBC radio1/johnpeel kenickie page
 Kenickie Corner
 Planet Kenickie
 Kenickie Fried Chicken

1994 establishments in England
1998 disestablishments in England
Musical groups established in 1994
Musical groups established in 1998
English indie rock groups
British indie pop groups
English pop punk groups
Britpop groups
Female-fronted musical groups
Musical groups from Sunderland
Fierce Panda Records artists
Warner Records artists